Samuel Wong Ping-wai, MBE, JP (2 November 1937, Hong Kong – 4 June 1997, Hong Kong) was a member of the Legislative Council of Hong Kong (1991–97) and also the Urban Council of Hong Kong.

His Death and His Family
Samuel Wong died of a heart attack on 4 June 1997 in Hong Kong. At that time, he had three children: Andrew Wong, Adrian Wong and a daughter. His 2 grandchildren were born later in 2008 and 2009. Samuel was buried at a local graveyard in Chai Wan, Hong Kong.

References

1937 births
1997 deaths
Members of the Urban Council of Hong Kong
Members of the Order of the British Empire
Alumni of the University of Strathclyde
Alumni of the University of Wales
HK LegCo Members 1991–1995
HK LegCo Members 1995–1997
District councillors of Wan Chai District